Salmo macrostigma is a species of freshwater trout endemic to Algeria in northwest Africa. It can reach a length of  TL.

The name Salmo trutta macrostigma (or Salmo macrostigma) has previously been used of many populations also in other regions around the Mediterranean, but in recent years those have been split into separate local species.

Sources

Fish of North Africa
macrostigma
Endemic fauna of Algeria
Fish described in 1858
Taxa named by Auguste Duméril
Taxonomy articles created by Polbot